Diazotrophs are bacteria and archaea that fix gaseous nitrogen in the atmosphere into a more usable form such as ammonia.

A diazotroph is a microorganism that is able to grow without external sources of fixed nitrogen. Examples of organisms that do this are rhizobia and Frankia (in symbiosis) and Azospirillum. All diazotrophs contain iron-molybdenum or iron-vanadium nitrogenase systems. Two of the most studied systems are those of Klebsiella pneumoniae and Azotobacter vinelandii. These systems are studied because of their genetic tractability and their fast growth.

Etymology
The word diazotroph is derived from the words diazo ("di" = two + "azo" = nitrogen) meaning "dinitrogen (N2)" and troph meaning "pertaining to food or nourishment", in summary dinitrogen utilizing. The word azote means nitrogen in French and was named by French chemist and biologist Antoine Lavoisier, who saw it as the part of air which cannot sustain life.

Types of diazotrophs
Diazotrophs are scattered across Bacteria taxonomic groups (as well as a couple of Archaea). Even within a species that can fix nitrogen there may be strains that do not. Fixation is shut off when other sources of nitrogen are available, and, for many species, when oxygen is at high partial pressure. Bacteria have different ways of dealing with the debilitating effects of oxygen on nitrogenases, listed below.

Free-living diazotrophs
 Anaerobes—these are obligate anaerobes that cannot tolerate oxygen even if they are not fixing nitrogen. They live in habitats low in oxygen, such as soils and decaying vegetable matter. Clostridium is an example. Sulphate-reducing bacteria are important in ocean sediments (e.g. Desulfovibrio), and some Archean methanogens, like Methanococcus, fix nitrogen in muds, animal intestines and anoxic soils.
 Facultative anaerobes—these species can grow either with or without oxygen, but they only fix nitrogen anaerobically. Often, they respire oxygen as rapidly as it is supplied, keeping the amount of free oxygen low. Examples include Klebsiella pneumoniae, Paenibacillus polymyxa, Bacillus macerans, and Escherichia intermedia.
 Aerobes—these species require oxygen to grow, yet their nitrogenase is still debilitated if exposed to oxygen. Azotobacter vinelandii is the most studied of these organisms. It uses very high respiration rates, and protective compounds, to prevent oxygen damage. Many other species also reduce the oxygen levels in this way, but with lower respiration rates and lower oxygen tolerance.
 Oxygenic photosynthetic bacteria (cyanobacteria) generate oxygen as a by-product of photosynthesis, yet some are able to fix nitrogen as well. These are colonial bacteria that have specialized cells (heterocysts) that lack the oxygen generating steps of photosynthesis. Examples are Anabaena cylindrica and Nostoc commune. Other cyanobacteria lack heterocysts and can fix nitrogen only in low light and oxygen levels (e.g. Plectonema). Some cyanobacteria, including the highly abundant marine taxa Prochlorococcus and Synechococcus do not fix nitrogen, whilst other marine cyanobacteria, such as Trichodesmium and Cyanothece, are  major contributors to oceanic nitrogen fixation.
  Anoxygenic photosynthetic bacteria do not generate oxygen during photosynthesis, having only a single photosystem which cannot split water. Nitrogenase is expressed under nitrogen limitation. Normally, the expression is regulated via negative feedback from the produced ammonium ion but in the absence of N2, the product is not formed, and the by-product H2 continues unabated [Biohydrogen]. Example species: Rhodobacter sphaeroides, Rhodopseudomonas palustris, Rhodobacter capsulatus.

Symbiotic diazotrophs
 Rhizobia—these are the species that associate with legumes, plants of the family Fabaceae. Oxygen is bound to leghemoglobin in the root nodules that house the bacterial symbionts, and supplied at a rate that will not harm the nitrogenase.
 Frankias—much less is known about/to these 'actinorhizal' nitrogen fixers. The bacteria also infect the roots leading to the formation of nodules. Actinorhizal nodules consist of several lobes, each lobe has a similar structure as a lateral root. Frankia is able to colonize in the cortical tissue of nodules where it fixes nitrogen. Actinorhizal plants and Frankias also produce haemoglobins, but their role is less well established than for rhizobia. Although at first it appeared that they inhabit sets of unrelated plants (alders, Australian pines, California lilac, bog myrtle, bitterbrush, Dryas), revisions to the phylogeny of angiosperms show a close relatedness of these species and the legumes. These footnotes suggest the ontogeny of these replicates rather than the phylogeny. In other words, an ancient gene (from before the angiosperms and gymnosperms diverged) that is unused in most species was reawakened and reused in these species.
 Cyanobacteria—there are also symbiotic cyanobacteria. Some associate with fungi as lichens, with liverworts, with a fern, and with a cycad. These do not form nodules (indeed most of the plants do not have roots). Heterocysts exclude the oxygen, as discussed above. The fern association is important agriculturally: the water fern Azolla harbouring Anabaena is an important green manure for rice culture.
 Association with animals—although diazotrophs have been found in many animal guts, there is usually sufficient ammonia present to suppress nitrogen fixation. Termites on a low nitrogen diet allow for some fixation, but the contribution to the termite's nitrogen supply is negligible. Shipworms may be the only species that derive significant benefit from their gut symbionts.

Cultivation
Under the  laboratory conditions, extra nitrogen sources are not needed in free living diazotrophs, and carbon sources (such as sucrose, glucose) and a small amount of inorganic salt are needed to the medium. Free living diazotrophs can directly use nitrogen (N2) in the air as nitrogen nutrition. However, while cultivating  several symbiotic diazotrophs such as rhizobia, it is necessary to add nitrogen nutrition, because rhizobia and other symbiotic nitrogen-fixing bacteria can not use molecular nitrogen (N2) in free living form.

Application

Biofertilizer

Diazotroph fertilizer is a kind of biofertilizer that can use nitrogen-fixing microorganisms to convert molecular nitrogen (N2) into ammonia (which is the formation of nitrogen available for the crops to use). These nitrogen nutrients then can be used in the process of protein synthesis for the plants. This whole process of nitrogen fixation by diazotroph is called biological nitrogen fixation. This biochemical reaction can be carried out under normal temperature and pressure conditions. So it does not require extreme conditions and specific catalysts in fertilizer production. Therefore, produce available nitrogen in this way can be cheap, clean and efficient. Nitrogen-fixing bacteria fertilizer is an ideal and promising biofertilizer. 

From the ancient time, people grow the leguminous crops to make the soil more fertile. And the reason for this is: the root of leguminous crops are symbiotic with the rhizobia (a kind of diazotroph). These rhizobia can be considered as a natural biofertilizer to provide available nitrogen in the soil. After harvesting the leguminous crops, and then grow other crops (may not be leguminous), they can also use these nitrogen remain in the soil and grow better.

Diazotroph biofertilizers used today include Rhizobium, Azotobacter, Azospirilium and Blue green algae (a genus of cyanobacteria). These fertilizer are widely used and commenced into industrial production. So far in the market, nitrogen fixation biofertilizer can be divided into liquid fertilizer and solid fertilizer. Most of the fertilizers are fermented in the way of liquid fermentation. After fermentation, the liquid bacteria can be packaged, which is the liquid fertilizer, and the fermented liquid can also be adsorbed with sterilized peat and other carrier adsorbents to form a solid microbial fertilizer. These nitrogen-fixation fertilizer has a certain effect on increasing the production of cotton, rice, wheat, peanuts, rape, corn, sorghum, potatoes, tobacco, sugarcane and various vegetables.

Importance
In terms of generating nitrogen available to all organisms, the symbiotic associations greatly exceed the free-living species with the exception of cyanobacteria.

Diazotroph plays an important roles in nitrogen cycle of the earth. In the terrestrial ecosystem, the diazotroph fix the (N2) from the atmosphere and provide the available nitrogen for the primary producer. Then the nitrogen is transferred to higher trophical levels and human beings. The formation and storage of nitrogen will all influenced by the transformation process. Also the available nitrogen fixed by the diazotroph is environmentally sustainable, which can reduce the use of  fertilizer, which can be an important topic in agricultural research. 

In marine ecosystem, prokaryotic phytoplankton (such as cyanobacteria) is the main nitrogen fixer, then the nitrogen consumed by higher trophical levels. The fixed N released from these organisms is a component of ecosystem N inputs. And also the fixed N is important for the coupled C cycle. A greater oceanic inventory of fixed N may increase the primary production and export of organic C to the deep ocean.

References

External links 
 Marine Nitrogen Fixation - The Basics (USC Capone Lab)
 Azotobacter
 Rhizobia
 Frankia & Actinorhizal Plants

Nitrogen cycle
Environmental microbiology